People Who Can Eat People Are the Luckiest People in the World is the second studio album by American folk punk band Andrew Jackson Jihad. The album was released by Asian Man Records on September 11, 2007. The title is derived from a line in Kurt Vonnegut's novel Hocus Pocus which itself is a reference to Barbra Streisand's song "People." The album was recorded and mixed by Jalipaz Nelson at Audioconfusion in Mesa, Arizona.  The album artwork was illustrated by Ryan Piscitelli. "People II: The Reckoning" features an interpolation of Simon and Garfunkel's song "Mrs. Robinson," and "Survival Song" features lyrics from Woody Guthrie’s "Do Re Mi."

Track listing

Personnel

Andrew Jackson Jihad
Sean Bonnette - lead vocals, guitar, glockenspiel
Ben Gallaty - bass, electric guitar, slide guitar, backing vocals
John De La Cruz - drums
Dylan Cook - mandolin, vocals

Additional Personnel
Andrew Jemsek - accordion, vocals
Andrew Lane - trumpet
John Martin - vocals
Teague Cullen - accordion, violin, cello, singing saw
Tobie Milford - violin
Jeff Carroll - mastering
Jalipaz Nelson - recording, mixing, noise
Ryan Piscitelli - artwork, layout

Notes

References

2007 albums
Asian Man Records albums
AJJ (band) albums